The International Exhibition Centre in Kyiv is the largest exhibition centre in Ukraine. Located in the western portion of Livoberezhna microdistrict, the center was opened in October 2002, and the head of the center since its construction was Anatoly Tkachenko.

The Eurovision Song Contest 2017 was held at the Centre.

History

The idea of building the complex was from Viktor Tkachenko, then director of the Palace of Sports. Current director of the center, Ukrainian architect Yanush Wig designed the complex, and Eduard Safronov was the head of its construction.

The location for construction was at the left bank of Kyiv, in the times of Soviet Union it was planned to build a futuristic public center in that area, but the project wasn't completed in its full scale. The first pavillon of the exhibition center was built between 1999 and 2002; it was opened in October 2002. The IEC was built according to the modern standards and became one of the leaders of forum organizers, holding almost fifty events in 2003. During 2004 and 2005 two new pavillons were built, resulting in the exhibition centre now being able to hold more than 100 events per year. 

In 2013, the centre held the 20th OSCE Ministerial Council, getting the OSCE Certificate for a high quality organization. In May 2017, the IEC was the host venue for Eurovision Song Contest 2017.

In 2017 it was decided to expand the exhibition center. The project included new exhibition halls, underground parking, concert hall and a 13-storey hotel. The new two-storey hall was built from 2017 to 2019.

Architecture
The center combines in a single architectural ensemble three pavilions with a total area of 58,000 sqm, of which 28,018 m² are for exhibitions. The complex has a congress hall and fourteen conference rooms with a capacity of 90-600 seats, meeting rooms, rooms for storing valuables and weapons, cafes and fast food restaurants, bathrooms, toilets and air conditioning.

See also
List of convention and exhibition centers

References

External links

2002 establishments in Ukraine
Buildings and structures completed in 2002
Buildings and structures in Kyiv
Convention centers in Ukraine
Dniprovskyi District, Kyiv
Concert halls in Ukraine